The Federal Correctional Institution, Milan (FCI Milan) is a U.S. federal prison in Michigan, with most of the prison in York Township, and a portion in Milan. It is operated by the Federal Bureau of Prisons.

This prison is a low-security facility for male inmates. Its adjacent Federal Detention Center houses pretrial and holdover inmates.

History

FCI Milan was activated on April 6, 1933, as a "Federal Detention Farm" and has undergone mission changes throughout its history. FCI Milan held female inmates from 1933 to 1939, housed offenders sentenced under the Federal Youth Corrections Act of 1950, and was once a medium-security institution. The only federal execution in Michigan occurred on July 8, 1938, when Anthony Chebatoris was hanged for the murder of Henry Porter, a truck driver from Bay City, whom Chebatoris mistook for a police officer during a bank robbery.

Helen Gillis and Evelyn Frechette, the wives of notorious bank robbers Baby Face Nelson and John Dillinger, served one-year sentences at FCI Milan in the mid-1930s after being convicted of aiding their husbands as they evaded authorities.

Facility and inmate programs
There are very strict guidelines for admission due to the program's popularity.

The Life Connections Program (LCP) is an 18-month residential voluntary multi-faith restorative justice program which is offered in only four other federal prisons. The program is designed to reduce recidivism and bring reconciliation to the victim, community and inmate through personal transformation using the participant's faith commitment.

FCI Milan offers a unique program in federal prisons in conjunction with Milan High School where inmates can earn a high school diploma. Milan is the only federal prison which has a high school diploma program.

Notable inmates

See also

 List of U.S. federal prisons
 Federal Bureau of Prisons
 Incarceration in the United States

References

External links 
  FCI Milan from the Federal Bureau of Prisons

Federal Correctional Institutions in the United States
Buildings and structures in Washtenaw County, Michigan
Prisons in Michigan
1933 establishments in Michigan